Cwmynyscoy is a suburb of Pontypool in Torfaen, South Wales.

Statistics
All figures quoted have been derived from the 2001 Census unless otherwise stated.

Demographic Indicators
Total population of 1283 (Torfaen 90,949)

48.6% Male, 51.4% Female (Torfaen - 48.4% Male, 51.6% Female)

Age Structure; 19.5% aged between 0–15, 36.6% aged between 16 and 44, 25.3% aged 45–59/64 and 18.6% of pensionable age.

Socio-Economic Indicators

Activity Rates (2001)
Male (16-74) economic activity rate 63.4% (Torfaen 67.8%, Wales 67.7%), female (16-74) economic activity rate 48.9% (Torfaen 54.2%, Wales 54.5%), total economic activity rate 56.1% (Torfaen 60.8%, Wales 61.0%)

Unemployment (2004)
Whilst unemployment in the area has declined significantly and only 24 people remain registered unemployed, 16 males and 8 females (June 2004). Of the 24 claimants, 10 are under 24 years of age and 5 are registered as long-term unemployed (unemployed for over 52 weeks).

Home Ownership (2001)
Cwmynyscoy has a lower proportion of owner occupied households at 64.9% than Torfaen 68.3% and Wales as a whole 71.3%. 28.4% of properties are rented from the local authority (Torfaen 22.8%, Wales 13.7%)

Car Ownership (2001)
32.7% of households in Cwmynyscoy do not own a car (Torfaen 27.2%, Wales 26.0%).

Education (2001)
Residents qualified to Level 4/5: 8.9% (Torfaen 13.6%, Wales 17.4%). (Level 4/5: First degree, Higher degree, NVQ levels 4 and 5, HNC, HND, Qualified Teacher Status, Qualified Medical Doctor, Qualified Dentist, Qualified Nurse, Midwife, Health Visitor)

Lone Parent Families (2001)
10.9% of households in Cwmynyscoy are occupied by lone parents (Torfaen 10.8%, Wales 10.6%).

Nature reserve
Cwmynyscoy Quarry is a local nature reserve, within a disused quarry, home to a number of species including noctule bats and barn owls.

References

Suburbs of Pontypool